Sore is a commune in the Landes department in Nouvelle-Aquitaine in southwestern France. It is in the middle of the Landes de Gascogne Regional Natural Park. Sore is about 65 km south of Bordeaux and about 50 km inland east of the Atlantic coast.

Population

See also
Communes of the Landes department
Parc naturel régional des Landes de Gascogne

References

Communes of Landes (department)